The Kamnik Saddle Lodge is a mountain hostel located just below Kamnik Saddle, with Mount Brana to its west and Mount Planjava to its east, and the Kamnik Bistrica Valley to its south. On its north is a steep descent toward the Logar Valley, home to Rinka Falls.

The hut was first built in 1906, then rebuilt in 1983, and then again slightly modified in 2010.

Starting points 
 3.30 h: from the Kamnik Bistrica Lodge (601 m)
 1:30 h: from the Frischauf Lodge at Okrešelj (1396 m)
 1:45 h: from the Suhadolnik Farm (ca. 850 m)

Neighbouring mountain lodges
 6 h: to the Zois Lodge at Kokra Saddle (1793 m) above Turska gora
 3 h: to the Kocbek Lodge at Korošica (1808 m) above Planjavo

Neighbouring mountain peaks 
 1.30 h: Brana (2252 m)
 2 h: Planjava (2394 m)
 4 h: Ojstrica (2350 m) over Škarje
 2.30 h: Mount Turska (2251 m)

See also 
 Slovenian Mountain Hiking Trail

External links 
 Kamniška koča na Kamniškem sedlu  Description, Route &Photos (slo)
 www.psz.si Kamniška koča na Kamniškem sedlu on PSS

Mountain huts in Slovenia
Kamnik–Savinja Alps